Elliot Pilgrim (19 January 1886 – 22 December 1970) was a cricketer from British Guiana. He played in three first-class matches for British Guiana in 1909/10.

See also
 List of Guyanese representative cricketers

References

External links
 

1886 births
1970 deaths
Cricketers from British Guiana